Ali Adde is a town in Djibouti. It is located some 69 kilometers south of the capital, Djibouti City, with an elevation of 530 meters above sea level. It is the site of a UNHCR base hosting 12,363 refugees camp as of 2015. It sprawls on a wide basin surrounded by granitic mountains on some sides. The center is run by the UNHCR, and its operations are financed by foreign donors.

History

The Ali Adde settlement dates back several centuries, and is one of the oldest towns in Djibouti after Tadjoura and Obock. Its place-name literally means "the white or clear place" in the Afro-Asiatic Somali language.

According to an old legend, the present-day territory of Ali Adde was covered by trees, with a wadi crossing the area. Originally a small settlement, the town grew under the reign of the Ifat Sultanate and Adal Sultanate. It later formed a part of the French Somaliland protectorate in the first half of the 20th century. In December 1942, about 1,000 British and French Free troops occupied the town. Ali Adde has an old fort near the Wadi Danan, which was built by the French Army in the 19th century.

Overview
The town lies on the National Highway 5.

Nearby towns and villages include Ali Sabieh, Holhol, Dewele, Assamo and Guisti.

Geography
Ali Adde is located in a valley in the southern section of the country. The city is situated in a mountainous area, in an enclosed valley of the highlands. It sits at an elevation of 530 meter (1,740 ft) above sea level. One can also take in the local wildlife attracted by the relatively abundant rainfall. Among these are the black-backed jackal, dorcas gazelle, Felis, caracal, birds and the hamadryas baboon.

Climate
Its weather is characterized by sweltering and dry summers and pleasant to very warm winters, when most of the precipitation is concentrated (spring and autumn being hot transitional seasons). However, due to the town's altitude and inland location, its climatic features include the very low humidity, and temperatures usually falling below  at night, which makes summer distinctly less unpleasant compared to coastal cities. Due to its  altitude, temperatures are relatively normal for a town located not particularly far from the hottest deserts in the world. The town is known for its normal climate during the summer periods.

Ali Adde has a hot arid climate (BWh) by the Köppen-Geiger system.

Demographics
As of 2018, the population of Ali Adde has been estimated to be 3,400. The town inhabitants belong to various mainly Afro-Asiatic-speaking ethnic groups, with the Issa Somali predominant. Before the UNHCR camp was opened, the local town population traditionally consisted of nomadic pastoralists, who were mainly camel and goat herders However, since the 1990s, an influx of refugees has dramatically shifted the demographics of the area.

References

‘Ali‘adde, Djibouti

External links
‘Ali‘adde, Djibouti

Populated places in Djibouti